The black-breasted mannikin or black-breasted munia (Lonchura teerinki) is a species of estrildid finch endemic to West Papua, Indonesia. It has an estimated global extent of occurrence of 20,000 to 50,000 km2. It is found in subtropical/ tropical lowland dry shrubland and high altitude grassland habitat. The status of the species is Least Concern.

References

BirdLife Species Factsheet

black-breasted mannikin
Birds of Western New Guinea
black-breasted mannikin
black-breasted mannikin